Olmstead Luca (18261869) was a Liberian pianist and composer. He composed the music for the Liberian national anthem, "All Hail, Liberia, Hail!". He came from a mixed-race family that had immigrated to Liberia from the southern United States.

Web sources 

1826 births
1869 deaths
19th-century classical composers
American emigrants to Liberia
American Romantic composers
Americo-Liberian people
Liberian male musicians
National anthem writers